Alice Tissot (1 January 1890 – 5 May 1971) was a French actress.

Partial filmography

 Poum à la chasse (1908)
 Le devoir (1908)
  (1909)
  (1909)
 The Two Girls (1921)
 A Son from America (1924)
 Captain Rascasse (1927)
 Cousin Bette (1928)
 Morgane, the Enchantress (1928)
 Cagliostro (1929)
 The Ladies in the Green Hats (1929)
 Nights of Princes (1930)
 Captain Craddock (1931)
 The Fortune (1931)
 The Blaireau Case (1932)
 A Happy Man (1932)
 If You Wish It (1932)
 Children of Montmartre (1933)
 Nemo's Bank (1934)
 Gold in the Street (1934)
 The Man with a Broken Ear (1934)
 Madame Bovary (1934)
 Antonia (1935)
 The Call of Silence (1936)
 The Ladies in the Green Hats (1937)
 Le Capitaine Fracasse (1943)
 Goodbye Darling (1946)
 Cyrano de Bergerac (1946)
 The Fighting Drummer (1953)
 Naked in the Wind (1953)
 If Paris Were Told to Us (1956)
 Gates of Paris (1957) - La concierge
  (1957) - La directrice du pensionnat
 Le tombeur (1958)
 En bordée (1958)
 Un couple (1960) - Mme Mitouflet
  (1960) - La concierge
 Césarin joue les 'étroits' mousquetaires (1962)

External links
 
 Alice Tissot on data.bnf.fr
 

1890 births
1971 deaths
French stage actresses
French film actresses
French silent film actresses
Actresses from Paris
20th-century French actresses
Burials at Père Lachaise Cemetery